58th Regiment or 58th Infantry Regiment may refer to:

 58th Regiment of Foot (disambiguation), three British Army units have carried this name 
 58th (Middlesex) Searchlight Regiment, Royal Artillery, a British Army unit, 1938–1955
 58th Vaughan's Rifles (Frontier Force), a unit of the British Indian Army
 58th Infantry Regiment (United States), most recent 58th Infantry in the United States Army

American Civil War
Union (Northern) Army
 58th Pennsylvania Infantry
 58th Illinois Volunteer Infantry Regiment 
 58th Indiana Infantry Regiment

Confederate (Southern) Army
 58th Regiment Alabama Infantry
 58th Virginia Infantry